Kaplan Singapore is a for-profit private education institution headquartered in Singapore with other campuses in Hong Kong, Taiwan, and the People's Republic of China. It was known as the Asia Pacific Management Institute (APMI) before it was acquired by Kaplan Inc., a subsidiary of the Graham Holdings Company, in May 2005.

It was established in 1989 as APMI, a regional provider of management education and lifelong learning programs and services. APMI was among the first private education organizations to be awarded the Singapore Quality Class (SQC) for Private Education Organizations. It is also one of the first management institutions to achieve the ISO 9000 quality certification in Singapore in 1996.

In May 2005, APMI was acquired by Kaplan Inc., a leading international provider of educational and career services for individuals, schools and businesses with 900,000 students around the globe. APMI headquartered campus and overseas operations have been rebranded under the Kaplan name.

Kaplan Singapore currently has two campuses located at the heart of the city near 6 MRT stations (Bencoolen, Bras Basah, Bugis, Dhoby Ghaut, Little India and Rochor): One at levels 6 to 9 of GR.ID (formerly PoMo) at Selegie Road and the other at level 2 of Wilkie Edge at Wilkie Road.

External links
Official website

Private universities in Singapore
For-profit universities and colleges
Educational institutions established in 1989
1989 establishments in Singapore